Little Cedar River is a  river in Menominee County in the U.S. state of Michigan.

Much of its course runs approximately parallel to US 41.

Tributaries 
From the mouth:
 (left) Little Kelley Creek
 (right) Hugos Brook
 (right) Hays Creek
 (right) Boyle Creek
 (right) DeGroote Lake
 (left) Ross Creek
 (left) Snow Creek
 (right) Poterfield Creek
 (right) Holmes Creek
 Kloman Lake (on Poterfield Creek)
 (right) Schetter Creek
 (right) Laurin Creek
 (left) Bog Brook
 (left) Nadeau Creek
 (left) Camp Two Creek
 Hermansville Lake

References 

Rivers of Michigan
Rivers of Menominee County, Michigan
Tributaries of Lake Michigan